Aluminium antimonide (AlSb) is a semiconductor of the group III-V family containing aluminium and antimony. The lattice constant is 0.61 nm. The indirect bandgap is approximately 1.6 eV at 300 K, whereas the direct band gap is 2.22 eV.

Its electron mobility is 200 cm²·V−1·s−1 and hole mobility 400 cm²·V−1·s−1 at 300 K. Its refractive index is 3.3 at a wavelength of 2 μm, and its dielectric constant is 10.9 at microwave frequencies.

AlSb can be reacted with other III-V materials to produce ternary materials including AlInSb, AlGaSb and AlAsSb.

Aluminum antimonide is rather flammable because of the reducing tendency of the antimonide (Sb3−) ion. It burns to produce aluminum oxide and antimony trioxide.

See also
 Gallium antimonide
 Indium antimonide
 Aluminium arsenide

References

III-V semiconductors
Antimonides
Aluminium compounds
III-V compounds
Zincblende crystal structure